Ephedra fragilis, commonly named the joint pine, is a species of Ephedra that is native to the western Mediterranean region of southern Europe and Northern Africa, and from Madeira and the Canary Islands in the Atlantic.

Taxonomy
The plant was originally described by René Louiche Desfontaines in 1799 and placed in section Pseudobaccatae (=sect. Ephedra sect. Ephedra), "tribe" Scandentes by Otto Stapf in 1889.

In 1996 Robert A. Price classified E. fragilis in section Ephedra without recognizing a tribe.

Subspecies
Ephedra fragilis subsp. cossonii (Stapf) Maire - Algeria, Morocco, Western Sahara
Ephedra fragilis subsp. fragilis - Spain, Portugal, Balearic Islands, Sicily, Calabria, Morocco, Western Sahara, Algeria, Tunisia, Libya, Madeira, Canary Islands

Conservation
Ephedra fragilis is a Least Concern species on the IUCN Red List.

References

External links

fragilis
Flora of Europe
Flora of North Africa
Flora of Madeira
Flora of the Canary Islands
Plants described in 1799
Taxa named by René Louiche Desfontaines
Least concern plants